Mount Gambier, South Australia is a regional city in Australia.

Mount Gambier may also refer to:
 Mount Gambier (volcano), a dormant maar volcano adjoining the city
 City of Mount Gambier local government area
 Mount Gambier wine region
 Mount Gambier Airport
 Mount Gambier Gaol (closed in 1995)
 Mount Gambier Prison (opened in 1995 at a different site)
 Electoral district of Mount Gambier for the South Australian House of Assembly

See also
Gambier (disambiguation)